Jim Power: The Lost Dimension in 3-D is a platform game designed by French developer Loriciel and published by Electro Brain for the Super Nintendo Entertainment System and MS-DOS in 1993. A Sega Genesis version was planned, but was cancelled late in development. It was finally brought out by Piko Interactive in 2021, together with a brand new Nintendo Entertainment System version and a worldwide release of the Super NES version. A version for the Nintendo Switch and PlayStation 4 was released on June 2, 2022.

Gameplay
The game has several contrasting modes of gameplay, including side-view platforming, top-view, and horizontal shoot 'em up. It follows Jim Power in Mutant Planet as a different title, but at the same time reinterpreting the original game by taking many basic elements and levels from it. The soundtrack was composed by Chris Hülsbeck of Turrican fame.

Jim Power: The Lost Dimension in 3-D is often considered by gaming fans to be one of the most difficult games ever made. Despite its name, it is an entirely 2D game, although the game uses many layers of parallax scrolling backgrounds moving in opposite directions to give a great sense of depth. Together with the 3D glasses that were packaged with the game, designed around the Pulfrich effect, this provided a unique "3D" experience for the time when polygonal 3D graphics were rudimentary and too expensive to implement. The 3D feeling could also be related to the overhead stages, showing rotating effects in the same vein as those depicted in similar games like Contra III: The Alien Wars.

Ports
A version of this game was also developed for the Mega Drive/Genesis under the name Jim Power: The Arcade Game. However, despite being in an almost complete state, this title was never published and remained unreleased until a ROM image was eventually leaked. This unpublished version features all levels and cannot be finished, although only a single music track (once again, arranged by Chris Hulsbeck) is present in the whole game and it uses placeholder sound effects from Mega Turrican. Jim Power: The Arcade Game is mostly the same game as Jim Power: The Lost Dimension in 3-D, albeit with some minor graphical differences derived from technical aspects. All the top-view stages were also replaced by additional shoot-'em-up levels, hence the rebranded title of this version depicting a further arcade experience rather than a "3D" one. In 2021, a fully finished version of the game was released by Piko Interactive. Retaining the same Jim Power: The Lost Dimension in 3-D title of its counterpart versions, it restores the ending, music tracks and sound effects which were missing in the known prototype version, together with some other minor game polishing.

A brand new NES was also developed from scratch by Piko Interactive to go along the long lost Mega Drive/Genesis version and modern re-releases of previous versions of the game.

Music
The music in Jim Power: The Lost Dimension in 3-D was directly influenced by the music from the video game series Ys, as can be noted when comparing Jim Power's "Forgotten Path" and Ys III's "A Searing Struggle". In an interview, composer Chris Hulsbeck admits that the sound between these two songs is similar, but states that it was not done on purpose. "Inadvertently a melody from the Ys series must have slipped deep into my subconscious because one of the melodies of Jim Power turned out extremely similar".

Reception

The game received average reviews. Nintendo Power scored it 3.125 out of 5, while the reviewers of Electronic Gaming Monthly scored it an average of 6 out of 10.

References

External links

1993 video games
Platform games
Run and gun games
DOS games
Super Nintendo Entertainment System games
Sega Genesis games
Nintendo Entertainment System games
Electro Brain games
Piko Interactive games
Windows games
Video games scored by Chris Huelsbeck
Video games developed in France
Single-player video games
Virtual Studio games